Javanshir, also known by his Middle Persian name Juvansher (meaning young lion) was the son of Khosrow II, and Gordiya, the sister of Bahram Chobin. The 9th-century historian Dinawari mentions him as ruling before the Sasanian queen Boran. This would mean that he had managed to avoid Kavad II's slaughter of his brothers. This, however, remains obscure, and no coins of Juvansher have been found either.

References

Sources
 

7th-century Iranian people
Year of death unknown
Year of birth unknown
Sasanian princes
Children of Khosrow II